Angels of the Street (Spanish: Ángeles de la calle) is a 1953 Cuban-Mexican drama film directed by Agustín P. Delgado.

Cast
 Rolando Barral as Pititi
 Hortensia Betancourt as Mariposa
 Jaime Calpe
 Emilia Guiú as Magda
 Andrea Palma as Regla
 Ismael Pérez
 Gustavo Rojo
 Enrique Santisteban
 Lupe Suárez as Brigida

References

Bibliography
 Alfonso J. García Osuna. The Cuban Filmography: 1897 through 2001. McFarland, 2003.

External links
 

1953 films
Cuban drama films
Mexican drama films
1950s Spanish-language films
Films directed by Agustín P. Delgado
1953 drama films
Cuban black-and-white films
Mexican black-and-white films
1950s Mexican films